James Herbert Zumberge (December 27, 1923 – April 15, 1992) was a professor of geology and president of Grand Valley State University from 1962 to 1969, of Southern Methodist University from 1975 to 1980, and of the University of Southern California from 1980 to 1991.

Biography

Early life and education
James Herbert Zumberge was born in Minneapolis, Minnesota, in 1923 to Herbert Samuel and Helen Reich Zumberge. 
He served in the military (U.S. Marine Corps) before earning a Ph.D. in geology from the University of Minnesota in 1950. His thesis was on the formation of the Great Lakes.

Career
Zumberge taught for several years at the University of Michigan and later was the director of the earth sciences school at the University of Arizona. He led several expeditions in Antarctica and was chief glaciologist for the U.S. Ross Ice Shelf project in Antarctica. Cape Zumberge and the Zumberge Coast bear his name.

He served as the first President of Grand Valley State University from 1962 to 1968, Director of the School of Earth Science at University of Arizona 1968–72, Chancellor of the University of Nebraska-Lincoln from 1972 to 1975, the seventh president of Southern Methodist University from 1975 to 1980, and the ninth president of University of Southern California from 1980 to 1991.

While President of USC, Zumberge instituted a revenue-center management system, where individual schools and units were responsible for their own revenue and expenses.

Death and legacy
Zumberge died at age 68 in Pasadena, California, as the result of a brain tumor.

James H. Zumberge Hall (originally the Zumberge Library) and Zumberge Pond at Grand Valley State University's Allendale Campus are named for him, as well as Zumberge Hall of Sciences, one of the natural science buildings at USC.

References

External links
 USC History
 GVSU History
 Great Alumni, University of Minnesota

1923 births
1992 deaths
Presidents of the University of Southern California
Presidents of Grand Valley State University
Presidents of Southern Methodist University
20th-century American geologists
University of Minnesota College of Science and Engineering alumni
Chancellors of the University of Nebraska-Lincoln
University of Michigan faculty
United States Marine Corps personnel of World War II
Deaths from brain cancer in the United States
American glaciologists
Scientists from Minneapolis
20th-century American academics